The Family That Plays Together is the second album by the American rock band Spirit. It was released by Ode Records in December 1968. It was voted number 575 in Colin Larkin's All Time Top 1000 Albums 3rd Edition (2000).

The cover was photographed at the Sunset Highland Motel, 6830 Sunset Boulevard in Hollywood, California, across the street from Hollywood High School.

Title
The title alludes to the slogan "The family that prays together stays together", created by ad-writer Al Scalpone for the Family Rosary Crusade and popular in American and British parlance beginning in the 1940s. During this time the band lived together in a house in Topanga, California, near Los Angeles. The title was also inspired by the stepson-stepfather relationship between lead guitarist Randy California and percussionist Ed Cassidy.

Music
The group expands on psychedelic rock and moves toward an early form of progressive rock. "It Shall Be" and "Silky Sam" incorporate jazz influences. "Jewish" has Hebrew lyrics taken from the traditional song "Hine Ma Tov", based on King David's Psalm 133. The album's arrangements were by Marty Paich, who also arranged other albums by the group.

Release history 
After the first issue, the stereo master tapes for this album were locked in storage and unavailable. Because of this, subsequent CD releases by Sony, as well as the recent vinyl reissue by Sundazed Records, are taken from new stereo mixes made from the original multi-track tapes by Bob Irwin, Randy California and Ed Cassidy in 1996. Liner notes on the 1996 CD reissue state that it was "mixed and mastered by Vic Anesini, Sony Music Studios, New York". (The tracks that appeared on the Time Circle, 1968–1972 compilation were remixed as well, though those mixes are different.)

The 1996 CD reissue also contains five bonus tracks. Two of these appeared on the Time Circle, 1968–1972 compilation, while the other three are previously unissued.

In 2017, Audio Fidelity reissued the album as a numbered limited edition hybrid SACD. This was the first release to use the original stereo mixes since the 1970s. This edition also includes bonus tracks in the same mixes as on the 1996 reissue.

Track listing

Personnel

Spirit 
Jay Ferguson - lead vocals, keyboards, percussion
Randy California - lead guitar, lead vocals, backing vocals, bass
John Locke - keyboards
Mark Andes - bass, backing vocals
Ed Cassidy - drums, percussion

Production 
Lou Adler - producer
Bob Irwin - producer
Marty Paich - horn arrangements, string arrangements
Vic Anesini - mastering, mixing (reissue)
Armin Stiener - engineer
Adam Block - project director
Tom Wilkes - art direction
Guy Webster - photography

Charts 
Album

Singles

References 

Spirit (band) albums
1968 albums
Epic Records albums
Legacy Recordings albums
Albums produced by Lou Adler
Sony Records albums
Sundazed Records albums
Albums arranged by Marty Paich